The 2011–12 season was Peterhead's first season back in the Scottish Third Division, having been relegated from the Scottish Second Division at the end of the 2010–11 season. Peterhead also competed in the Challenge Cup, League Cup and the Scottish Cup.

Summary
Peterhead finished fifth in the Third Division. They reached the second round of the Scottish Challenge Cup, the first round of the League Cup and the fourth round of the Scottish Cup, losing 3–0 to Scottish Premier League side Celtic at Balmoor.

Results & fixtures

Third Division

Challenge Cup

Scottish League Cup

Scottish Cup

Player statistics

Squad 
Last updated 5 May 2012 

 

|}

Disciplinary record

Includes all competitive matches.

Last updated 5 May 2012

Awards

Last updated 14 May 2012

League table

Transfers

Players in

Players out

See also
List of Peterhead F.C. seasons

References

Peterhead F.C. seasons
Peterhead